The Richmond–Berea Micropolitan Statistical Area, as defined by the United States Census Bureau, is an area consisting of two counties in  Kentucky, anchored by the cities of Richmond and Berea. As of the 2000 census, the μSA had a population of 87,454 (though a July 1, 2019 estimate placed the population at 107,093).

The Richmond–Berea Micropolitan Statistical Area is part of the Lexington–Fayette–Frankfort–Richmond Combined Statistical Area.

Counties
Madison
Rockcastle

Communities

Incorporated places
Berea (Principal city)
Brodhead
Livingston
Mount Vernon
Richmond (Principal city)

Unincorporated places
Bighill
Boonesborough
Bybee
Kirksville
Waco
Valley View

Demographics
As of the census of 2000, there were 87,454 people, 33,696 households, and 22,982 families residing within the μSA. The racial makeup of the μSA was 94.41% White, 3.65% African American, 0.27% Native American, 0.61% Asian, 0.02% Pacific Islander, 0.28% from other races, and 1.08% from two or more races. Hispanic or Latino of any race were 0.90% of the population.

The median income for a household in the μSA was $28,168, and the median income for a family was $35,831. Males had a median income of $29,372 versus $20,438 for females. The per capita income for the μSA was $14,564.

See also
Kentucky census statistical areas

References